Jean-Baptiste Mailhe (2 June 1750 - 1 June 1834) was a politician during the French Revolution. He gave his name to the Mailhe amendment, which sought to delay the execution of Louis XVI.

Biography
Mailhe was born in 1750 in Guizerix, Gascony, the son of a landowner. He became a lawyer in Toulouse.

Elected to the Legislature in 1791, he was part of the Diplomatic Committee and sat alongside the Girondins, who supported the policy of war against Austria.

Re-elected in September 1792 as Member of Parliament for the Haute-Garonne in the National Convention, he sat with La Plaine, remaining close to the Girondists.

The Trial of Louis XVI

Mailhe led the committee to decide whether King Louis XVI could be tried despite the constitution stating that the king was inviolable. Mailhe's report concluded that constitutional inviolability was a gift of the people, and so could be revoked by them. Thus King Louis XVI could indeed be tried by the National Convention.

At the trial of the king, he proposed  "Death, but [...] I think it would be worthy of the Convention to consider whether it would be useful to policy to delay the execution" which was supported by twenty-six MPs. This "Mailhe amendment" was regarded by some of Mailhe's contemporaries as a conspiracy to save the king's life. It was even suggested that Mailhe had been paid, perhaps by Spanish gold. In the final vote, twenty three MPs voted for death invoking the condition of the Mailhe amendment.

1793 - 1834
On 2 June 1793, Paris sections took over the Convention, calling for administrative and political purges, a low fixed price for bread, and a limitation of the electoral franchise to sans-culottes (working class radicals) alone. With the backing of the National Guard, they persuaded the Convention to arrest 31 Girondist leaders. After that, Mailhe confined himself to the Legislation Committee, not reappearing in the National Convention until several weeks after the fall of Robespierre in July 1794.

Mailhe was elected to the council of the Five Hundred (the lower house) in 1795. After that he became a journalist, editor of the Journal General de France, a publication with a royalist slant. He was banished after the coup of 18 Fructidor (1797). The consular government recalled him after a year and he became a lawyer in Paris. At the Restoration of the monarchy, and the 1816 Act against the regicides, he was forced to leave the country again. He went to Brussels, where he continued to practise law, returning to France after the revolution of 1830.

See also

Trial of Louis XVI

References

French politicians
French Revolution
1792 events of the French Revolution
1793 events of the French Revolution
1750 births
1834 deaths